René-Édouard Caron (21 October 1800 – 13 December 1876) was a Canadian politician, judge, and the second Lieutenant Governor of Quebec.

He was born in Sainte-Anne-de-Beaupré, Lower Canada, the son of Augustin Caron, a well-to-do farmer and Member of the House of Assembly (MHA) for Lower Canada, and Élizabeth Lessard. He studied Latin at the college of Saint-Pierre-de-la-Rivière-du-Sud, which prepared him for admittance to the Petit Séminaire de Québec, in 1813. After later studying law in André-Rémi Hamel's office, Caron was called to the Quebec Bar in 1826. In 1828, he married Marie-Vénérande-Joséphine de Blois, the daughter of Joseph de Blois and Marie-Vénérande Ranvoyzé.

In 1833, he was elected as a municipal representative for the Palais district of Quebec City. In 1834, he was elected mayor by the city councillors and served until 1836. He was mayor again from 1840 to 1846. He was mayor when cholera broke out in 1834 and when a fire nearly destroyed the city in 1845.

In 1834, he was elected a Member of the Legislative Assembly of Lower Canada for the riding of Upper Town of Quebec. In 1841, he was appointed a member of the Legislative Council of the Province of Canada. He was the Speaker from 1843 to 1847 and again from 1848 to 1853. From 1844 to 1853, he was also in a law partnership with Louis de Gonzague Baillairgé. In 1853, he was appointed Judge of the Court of Appeal, and in 1855 of the Court of the Queen's Bench. In 1859, he took part in the codification of the civil laws. He remained a judge until 1873 when he was appointed the second Lieutenant-Governor of Quebec. He served until his death in December 1876. He was buried at Cimetière Notre-Dame-de-Belmont in Sainte-Foy.

Family
He married Marie-Vénérande-Joséphine de Blois, daughter of Joseph de Blois and Marie-Vénérande Ranvoyzé, of Quebec, on 16 September 1828, at Notre-Dame de Québec. She died on 25 March 1880, and was buried at cimetière Notre-Dame-de-Belmont, alongside her husband.
The couple's son Adolphe-Philippe later became a member of the Canadian House of Commons and cabinet minister. Their daughter Corine married Sir Charles Fitzpatrick, who became Chief Justice of Canada and Lieutenant-Governor of Quebec. Their daughter Marie-Joséphine married Jean-Thomas Taschereau, later a judge in the Supreme Court of Canada, and was the mother of Louis-Alexandre Taschereau, a premier of Quebec.

Descendants

   Augustin Caron (17781862), m. Élizabeth Lessard (17741823)
  René-Édouard Caron (18001876), m. Marie-Vénérande-Joséphine de Blois (18291886)
 Adolphe-Philippe Caron (18431908), m. Marie-Clotilde-Alice Baby (18331924)
 Marie-Elmire Corinne Caron, m. Sir Charles Fitzpatrick (18531942)
  Marie-Joséphine Caron (18391915), m. Jean-Thomas Taschereau (18141893)
 Joseph-Édouard Taschereau (18631891), m. Marie-Clara-Amelie Dionne (18651948)
 Louise-Josephine Taschereau (18661959)
  Louis-Alexandre Taschereau (18671952), m. Marie-Emma-Adine Dionne (18711952)

References

External links
 
 
 

1800 births
1876 deaths
Judges in Quebec
Lieutenant Governors of Quebec
Mayors of Quebec City
Members of the Legislative Assembly of Lower Canada
Members of the Legislative Council of the Province of Canada
Province of Canada judges
French Quebecers